The Man Who Paid is a 1922 American silent drama film directed by Oscar Apfel and starring Wilfred Lytell, Norma Shearer, and Florence Rogan.

Plot
As described in a film magazine, Oliver Thornton (Lytell), after serving a prison term on the false accusation of having embezzled bank funds, seeks to forget in the wilds of the north and secures a position as an agent for a far northern trading company. There he falls in love with Jeanne and marries her. A baby girl, Little Jeanne (Rogan), is born to the young couple. Louis Duclos (Jones), an unscrupulous trapper and former suitor of Jeanne, learns somehow of Oliver's prison record and attempts to estrange Jeanne from her husband. Failing in this, he plans to put Oliver away and kidnap the wife while also stealing the papers showing the location of a silver mine that Oliver and his brother Guy (Byer) have found. Guy has arrived with proof of Oliver's innocence of the embezzling charge, and the two are on a fishing trip when Jeanne is kidnapped. Warned by an Indian, the brothers race to the assistance of Jeanne, and after a series of adventures during which Louis is killed by an Indian he has injured, and Jeanne is rescued. Now with his name cleared of the charge and rich from the silver mine, Oliver is asked by Guy to return to the city and take up his business career. After some struggle with his ambition, Oliver elects to remain in the woods, happy in the love of his wife and child.

Cast
 Wilfred Lytell as Oliver Thornton  
 Norma Shearer as Jeanne Thornton  
 Florence Rogan as Little Jeanne  
 Fred C. Jones as Louis Duclos  
 Bernard Siegel as Anton Barbier  
 David Hennessy as McNeill  
 Charles Byer as Guy Thornton  
 Erminie Gagnon as Lizette  
 Frank Montgomery as Songo

References

Bibliography
 Jack Jacobs & Myron Braum. The films of Norma Shearer. A. S. Barnes, 1976.

External links

1922 films
Films directed by Oscar Apfel
American silent feature films
1920s English-language films
American black-and-white films
Silent American drama films
1922 drama films
1920s American films